Jennifer Oxley is an American author, illustrator, television writer/director, and songwriter. She is the co-creator of the PBS children's program Peg + Cat. She was the creative director of Wonder Pets! and 3rd & Bird, as well as the animator for the theme song and transitions on Oobi. She has won an Emmy Award and a Humanitas Award for her work on the Nick Jr. show Little Bill.

In 1999, she joined Little Airplane Productions as the studio's creative director. She developed a style of animation called "photo-puppetry" that was used in Oobi, Wonder Pets! and 3rd & Bird. She was a director for many of Little Airplane's shows.

Oxley has also adapted a number of episodes of Wonder Pets! and Blue's Clues into books. She has directed eight short films that appeared on Sesame Street.

References

External links

Little Airplane Productions, Inc.

Living people
Year of birth missing (living people)
American animators
American children's writers
American women children's writers
American illustrators
American women illustrators
American television directors
American television writers
American women animators
American women television writers
American women television directors
21st-century American women